Rajamangala University of Technology Lanna (RMUTL) is a science and technology university in Chiang Mai Province, northern Thailand. It offers vocational certificate, advanced vocational certificate, undergraduate, and master's degrees.

History 
RMUTL was founded in 1957 under a royal charter granted by His Majesty the King Bhumibol Adulyadej under the name Vocational Institute. In 1975, it was considered a campus of the Institute of Technology and Vocational Education and it used to be under the name of " Northern Technical Institution, in Chiang Mai, Thailand. In 1988 it was named Rajamangala Institute of Technology (RIT), Northern Campus by His Majesty the King. To serve the needs of people in Thailand and other countries and to meet international standards, RIT developed its administration structure and education management and became Rajamangala University of Technology (RMUT) in 2003. RMUT consists of nine universities with six campuses in the north of Thailand: Chiang Mai, Chiang Rai, Lampang, Tak, Phitsanulok Province, and Nan.

Faculty 
 Faculty of Business Administration and Liberal Arts
 Faculty of Agricultural Science and Technology
 Faculty of Engineering
 Faculty of Arts and Architecture
 College of Technology and Interdisciplinary

Student union 
Rajamangala University of Technology Lanna Students’ Union is run by the students. It provides artistic, cultural, sporting, recreational, and educational activities. Each campus has a student union.

Activities
  Wai Khru Ceremony (to show respect to teachers)
  The Social Development Camp
  Rajamangala University Games
 Lanna Heritage

Application for admission

Application for the Diploma program
 Quota system (for students in 17 northern provinces)
 Direct admission system

Application for the undergraduate program
 Quota system (for students in 17 northern provinces)
 Direct admission system
 Entrance system

Education and research scholarships
 Income Contingent Loans: students obtain a loan for school fees and pay it back after they graduate and have a salary.
 General Scholarship is a scholarship is donated from many places, such as the student alumni, cooperative stores, public donations, bank, and other stores.
 The scholarship of Commission on Higher Education and the cooperative of International Science and Technology Development Agency Northern Network.
 The scholarship International Association for the Exchange of student for Technical Experience.

Facilities
  provides reading and audio-visual materials to support learning. The Academic Resources Center consists of the library, education technology division, and self–access learning center.
  preserves and promotes arts and culture including cooperation with the Central Arts and Culture Center.
  offers teaching to its students, staff, and the wider community to develop their English through computer-assisted instruction (CAI).
 : Rajamangala University of Technology cooperates with Chulalongkorn University in providing the test of English proficiency to measure students, staff, and interested people's abilities to use English.
  at Northern and Tak campuses provides information on computer numerically controlled milling machines (CNC machines).

Cooperation network

Australia 
 University of South Australia, Australia
 Massey University, New Zealand

Asia 
 Zhen Jen University, People's Republic of China
 Guangxi Normal University, People's Republic of China
 Guilin University of Technology, People's Republic of China
 University of Electro Communications, Japan
 Central Luzon State University, The Philippines
 Kolej University Teknikal Kebangsaan Malaysia (KUTKM), Malaysia
 University Collegye of Technology Tun Hussein Onn (KUITHO), Malaysia
 Kolej Universiti Kejuruteraan Utara Malaysia (KUKTM), Malaysia

United States 
 Oklahoma State University, USA

References

External links
 Rajamangala University of Technology Lanna Website

Education in Chiang Mai
Buildings and structures in Chiang Mai
Technical universities and colleges in Thailand
Educational institutions established in 2005
2005 establishments in Thailand